São Miguel Arcanjo is a municipality in the state of São Paulo in Brazil founded on 1 April 1889. It is part of the Metropolitan Region of Sorocaba. The population is 33,002 (2020 est.) and it has an area of 930.34 km². The economy of São Miguel Arcanjo is mostly agricultural.

The municipality contains part of the  Carlos Botelho State Park, created in 1982.

History 
The town was named after a chapel built in honor of St. Michael Archangel. The founders of São Miguel Arcanjo are Lt. Urias Emygdio Nogueira de Barros, known as Lt. Uriah, who moved here with his family in search of gold, and their two daughters: Maximina Nogueira Terra, who built the chapel, and Augusta Tereza Nogueira, who donated the land for construction.

References

Municipalities in São Paulo (state)